Ali Khan is one of the 44 union councils of Haripur District in Khyber-Pakhtunkhwa province of Pakistan. It is located east of the district capital, Haripur, at 33°59'22N 72°58'7E.

References

Union councils of Haripur District
Populated places in Haripur District